The Assyrian Timber Transportation relief is a well-known wall relief from the palace of Dur-Sharrukin, the Assyrian capital under Sargon II. The reliefs are held in the Louvre, having been excavated in 1844 by Paul-Émile Botta.

Gallery

Notes

References
 ALBENDA P., "A Mediterranean Seascape from Khorsabad", Assur 3/3, 1983, p. 1-17. 
 FONTAN E., "La Frise du Transport du Bois, Décor du Palais de Sargon II à Khorsabad", DOUMET-SERHAL Cl. (ed.), Cedrus Libani, Archaeology and History in Lebanon , 2001, vol.14, p. 58-63.
 Linder, E. (1986). The Khorsabad Wall Relief: A Mediterranean Seascape or River Transport of Timbers? Journal of the American Oriental Society, 106(2), 273-281. doi:10.2307/601591

Near East and Middle East antiquities of the Louvre